The 2004 World Senior Curling Championships were held from April 17 to 23 at the Gavlerinken arena in Gävle, Sweden.

The tournament was held in conjunction with the 2004 World Women's Curling Championship and the 2004 World Men's Curling Championship.

Men

Teams

Round robin

Group A

Group B

  Teams to playoffs

Classification games for 5–14 places
April 21, 12:00

For 5th place

For 7th place

For 9th place

For 11th place

For 13th place

Playoffs

Semi-finals
April 22, 17:00

Bronze medal game
April 23, 11:00

Final
April 23, 11:00

Final standings

Women

Teams

Round robin

  Teams to playoffs

Playoffs

Semi-finalsApril 22, 17:00

Bronze medal gameApril 23, 11:00

FinalApril 23, 11:00

Final standings

References

External links

World Senior Curling Championships
2004 in curling
International curling competitions hosted by Sweden
Sports competitions in Gävle
April 2004 sports events in Sweden